Rodney Rothman is an American writer, producer, and film director known for  Spider-Man: Into the Spider-Verse, Popstar: Never Stop Never Stopping, 22 Jump Street, Forgetting Sarah Marshall, Get Him to the Greek, Undeclared, and Late Show with David Letterman.

He has been nominated for five Primetime Emmy Awards for Outstanding Writing for a Variety Series, and also wrote the scripts for Grudge Match, 22 Jump Street and Spider-Man: Into the Spider-Verse, which served as his feature directorial debut.

Rothman is the author of the best-selling nonfiction humor book Early Bird: A Memoir of Premature Retirement. His writing has also appeared in The New Yorker, GQ, The New York Times, The New York Times Magazine, and McSweeney's Quarterly. His piece "My Fake Job" was included in The Best American Nonrequired Reading.

His work on Spider-Man: Into the Spider-Verse earned him the Academy Award for Best Animated Feature, the Golden Globe Award for Best Animated Feature Film and Annie Awards for Directing and Writing in a Feature Production.

Career

In 2005, Rothman wrote the book Early Bird: A Memoir of Premature Retirement. He has been nominated for five Primetime Emmy Awards for Outstanding Writing for a Variety Series, and also wrote the scripts for Grudge Match, 22 Jump Street and Spider-Man: Into the Spider-Verse, which served as his feature directorial debut. He co-directed the film with Bob Persichetti and Peter Ramsey, and co-wrote with Phil Lord. His work on the film earned him the Academy Award for Best Animated Feature, the Golden Globe Award for Best Animated Feature Film and Annie Awards for Directing and Writing in a Feature Production.

In 2021, Rothman partnered with former MGM Co-President of Production Adam Rosenberg to form Modern Magic, a media company focused "on creating event entertainment for the 21st-century audience, across animation and live-action". Modern Magic's upcoming projects include: an original animated feature inspired by the music of the late rapper Juice WRLD, an animated feature based on the SXSW award-winning short film Nuevo Rico, and a live-action feature that Quinta Brunson is currently scripting for Sony Pictures.

On August 15, 2022, Rothman revealed (via Twitter) that he was the person that Chris Farley picked up and threw into a dumpster during Farley's appearance on the Late Show with David Letterman in February 1996. Rothman was a writer at the Late Show at the time.

Filmography

Television

Film

Executive producer
 Forgetting Sarah Marshall  (2008)
 Year One  (2009)
 The Five-Year Engagement (2012)
 Spider-Man: Across the Spider-Verse (2023)
 Spider-Man: Beyond the Spider-Verse (2024)

Producer
 Get Him to the Greek (2010)
 Popstar: Never Stop Never Stopping (2016)

References

External links
 

Year of birth missing (living people)
Living people
American animated film directors
American animated film producers
American film producers
American male screenwriters
American television writers
Animation screenwriters
Annie Award winners
Directors of Best Animated Feature Academy Award winners
Hugo Award-winning writers
Jewish American screenwriters
Middlebury College alumni
Nebula Award winners
American male television writers
Sony Pictures Animation people
21st-century American Jews